Abkar Ashayir Garuh-ye 25 (also Romanized as Ābkār ʿAshāyīr Garūh-ye 25) is a village in Vakilabad Rural District, in the Central District of Arzuiyeh County, Kerman Province, Iran. At the 2006 census, its population was 342, in 63 families.

References 

Populated places in Arzuiyeh County